The Battle of Balaa took place on 3 September 1936, when Arab rebels ambushed a detachment of the British Army's Royal Lincolnshire Regiment near the village of Bal'a. The rebels, mostly well-disciplined and well-equipped Transjordanian and Syrian volunteers under Fawzi al-Qawuqji, put up a determined fight, killing at least 3 British soldiers and destroying two planes. In the end, the Arab militants retreated after an 8-hour firefight, with the British Army claiming victory.

References

1936–1939 Arab revolt in Palestine
1936 in Mandatory Palestine